Seohaeicola westpacificensis is a Gram-negative and aerobic bacterium from the genus of Seohaeicola which has been isolated from seawater from the western Pacific.

References 

Rhodobacteraceae